Arthur Emmett may refer to:

Arthur Emmett (judge) (born 1943), judge of the Federal Court of Australia
Arthur Emmett (cricketer) (1869–1935), English cricketer